Jeff Meyer is an American television director.  He has directed episodes of Everybody Loves Raymond, So Little Time, Coach, The Faculty, Still Standing and numerous episodes of Yes, Dear.

References

External links

American television directors
Living people
Place of birth missing (living people)
Year of birth missing (living people)